The 2017 North American Soccer League season was the 50th season of Division II soccer in the United States and Canada, and the 7th season of the modern North American Soccer League. The defending champions are the New York Cosmos who defeated Indy Eleven in Soccer Bowl 2016.

Eight clubs played in the NASL after provisional sanctioning by the United States Soccer Federation. Expansion side, San Francisco Deltas joined the league. After the 2016 season, Minnesota United left the league to join Major League Soccer, and the Tampa Bay Rowdies and Ottawa Fury left the league to join the United Soccer League.  The Carolina RailHawks FC rebranded as North Carolina FC. The Fort Lauderdale Strikers and Rayo OKC did not return to NASL for the 2017 season.

Teams, stadiums, and personnel

Stadiums and locations

Teams

Managerial changes

Spring season

Standings

Results

Fall season

Standings

Results

Playoffs

Combined standings

The Championship

Participants
 Miami FC (Spring and Fall season champion)
 San Francisco Deltas
 North Carolina FC
 New York Cosmos

Bracket

Semifinals

Soccer Bowl 2017

Attendance

* Five home games moved to other venues due to Hurricane Maria.
† One result missing. That game was rescheduled at an alternate venue. There was no admission charged and no attendance figure given.
Source: NASL & kenn.com

Statistical leaders

Top scorers 

Source:

Top assists 

Source:

|}

Clean sheets

Source:

Hat-tricks

Awards

Weekly awards

Monthly awards

League awards

 Golden Ball (MVP):  Stefano Pinho (Miami FC) 
 Golden Boot: Stefano Pinho (Miami FC) 
 Golden Glove: Mario Daniel Vega (Miami FC) 
 Coach of the Year: Marc Dos Santos (San Francisco Deltas) 
 Goal of the Year: Zach Steinberger (Jacksonville Armada) 
 Young (U23) Player of the Year: Jack Blake (Jacksonville Armada) 
 Humanitarian of the Year: Austin da Luz (North Carolina FC) 
 Fair Play Award: North Carolina FC

References

External links
 

 
North American Soccer League seasons